Louis Sabunji (1838–1931) was a Catholic priest and political figure who founded and edited various publications, including Al Nahla (Arabic: The Bee). He was also one of the earliest photographers in Beirut.

Early life and education
Sabunji was born in Diyarbakır in 1838. His family were Syriac Catholic. He had two brothers, Jurji and Daoud.

Sabunji received education at the seminary in the Syriac Catholic Church in Mount Lebanon in 1850. Then he attended the College of Pontifical Propaganda in Rome between 1853 and 1861 and received a PhD in theology. There he also learned photography.

Career
Following his graduation Sabunji became an ordained priest and was among the first Turkish and Latin instructors of the newly established Syrian Protestant College. He established and headed a school named Al Madrasa Al Siriyaniyya (Arabic: the Syriac School) in 1864. Then he began to work as a priest in Beirut. There he launched a weekly journal entitled Al Nahla in 1870. In August 1871 Sabunji suspended his journalistic activity in Beirut due to his clash with Butrus Al Bustani, a Christian journalist, and traveled various countries until 1864 when he returned to Beirut. Sabunji permanently left Beirut and settled in London in 1876 due to his anti-Ottoman political stance. 

In London Sabunji worked as the political editor of a publication entitled Mirat Al Ahwal which was launched by  Rizk Allah Hassun on 19 October 1876. Sabunji continued to publish Al Nahla in London from 1877. He founded another weekly in London entitled Al Khalifa. Sabunji was promoted to the professorship in the Arabic language at the Imperial Institute in London in the late 1880s.

Work
Sabunji was the author of several unpublished manuscripts, including Diwan and his diary Yıldız Sarayında bir Papaz (Turkish: A Priest in Yıldız Palace).

Later years and death
Sabunji settled in Egypt during World War I and then went to the United States where he lived in poverty. In 1931, he was murdered by burglars in Los Angeles at age 93.

References

19th-century journalists
1838 births
1931 deaths
1931 murders in the United States
People from Diyarbakır
People murdered in Los Angeles
Roman Catholic priests
Magazine founders
School founders
Murdered journalists
Syriac Catholic clergy